Rodopi was a Hansa A Type cargo ship which was built as Setubal in 1944 by Lübecker Flenderwerke AG, Lübeck, Germany for Oldenburg Portugiesische Dampschiffs Rhederei, Hamburg . She was seized as a prize of war in 1945, passing to the Ministry of War Transport and renamed Empire Gavel. She was allocated to Greece in 1945 and was renamed Rodopi. She was sold to Hellenic Lines in 1949. She was scrapped in 1974.

Description

The engine was built by Rheinmetall-Börsig AG, Görlitz.

History
Setubal was a Hansa A Type cargo ship built in 1944 as yard number 404 by Lübecker Flenderwerke AG, Lübeck, Germany for Oldenburg Portugiesische Dampschiffs Rhederei, Hamburg. She was completed in January 1945. Her port of registry was Hamburg.

In May 1945, Setubal was seized as a prize of war at Lübeck,. The Code Letters GJLZ and United Kingdom Official Number 180646 were allocated. Her port of registry was London and she was operated under the management of John Bruce & Co. Ltd, Leith.

In 1947, Empire Gavel was allocated to Greece. The Greek government sold her in 1949 to Hellenic Lines and was renamed Rodopi. With their introduction in the 1960s, Rodopi was allocated the Lloyd's Register Number 5298444. She arrived at Gemlik, Turkey on 5 March 1974 for scrapping by Centas Celik, and was scrapped in April.

References

External links
Photograph of Rodopi.

1944 ships
Ships built in Germany
World War II merchant ships of Germany
Steamships of Germany
Empire ships
Ministry of War Transport ships
Merchant ships of the United Kingdom
Steamships of the United Kingdom
Merchant ships of Greece
Steamships of Greece